is a Japanese Professional baseball pitcher for the Fukuoka SoftBank Hawks of Nippon Professional Baseball.

Professional career
On October 26, 2017, Shiino was drafted by the Fukuoka Softbank Hawks in the 2017 Nippon Professional Baseball draft.

On May 27, 2018, Shiino pitched his debut game against the Tohoku Rakuten Golden Eagles as a relief pitcher.
 His regular season pitch was only that one game, but he pitched against the Saitama Seibu Lions in the 2018 Pacific League Climax Series in the Postseason. And he was selected as the Japan Series roster in the 2018 Japan Series.

On June 5, 2019, Shiino won the game as a relief pitcher for the first time. In 2019 season, he finished the regular season with a 36 Games pitched, a 5–2 Win–loss record, a 3.13 ERA, a 6 Holds, a 49 strikeouts in 46 innings. And he was selected as the Japan Series roster in the 2019 Japan Series.

In 2020 season, Shiino finished the regular season with a 12 Games pitched, a 1–1 Win–loss record, a 5.73 ERA, a one Hold, a 13 strikeouts in 11 innings. In the 2020 Japan Series against the Yomiuri Giants, He pitched for the first time in the Japan Series in Game 2 and contributed to the team's fourth consecutive Japan Series championship with no runs in bottom of 9th inning.

In 2021 seasons, He never had a chance to pitch in the Pacific League.

On June 7, 2022, Shiino pitched in the First League for the first time in two seasons. In 2022 seasons, he finished the regular season with 18 Games pitched, a 0–0 Win–loss record, a 4.01 ERA, a one holds and a 14 strikeouts in 34 innings.

References

External links

Career statistics - NPB.jp
34 Arata Shiino PLAYERS2022 - Fukuoka SoftBank Hawks Official site

1995 births
Living people
Fukuoka SoftBank Hawks players
Japanese baseball players
Nippon Professional Baseball pitchers
Kokushikan University alumni
Baseball people from Niigata Prefecture